Hana Benešová (born 19 April 1975 in Čáslav) is a retired Czech sprinter who competed in the 200 and 400 metres. She represented her country at the 1996 and 2000 Summer Olympics, as well as four consecutive World Championships, starting in 1993. In addition, she won three medals at the 1997 European U23 Championships.

Competition record

Personal bests
Outdoor
100 metres – 11.45 (-0.4 m/s) (Jablonec nad Nisou 1993)
200 metres – 22.57 (+1.7 m/s) (Turku 1997)
400 metres – 51.18 (Prague 1997)
Indoor
60 metres – 7.38 (Paris 1994)
200 metres – 23.15 (Vienna 1997)
400 metres – 52.12 (Prague 1997)

References

1977 births
Living people
Czech female sprinters
Athletes (track and field) at the 1996 Summer Olympics
Athletes (track and field) at the 2000 Summer Olympics
Olympic athletes of the Czech Republic
People from Čáslav
World Athletics Indoor Championships medalists
Olympic female sprinters
Sportspeople from the Central Bohemian Region